İnegöl köfte are grilled meatballs (köfte) specific to İnegöl, Bursa, Turkey.

History

The dish was invented by one Mustafa Efendi, who was born in 1842 in Pazarcık, Ottoman Bulgaria, and emigrated to İnegöl in 1892. In 1893 he began selling meatballs in his shop at the bazaar on the Ankara-Bursa road. These proved popular, and the family-run shop is still in business till the present day.

Preparation

Kneaded in a round shape, the meatballs are cooked on a grill. The fame of İnegöl meatballs has spread throughout Turkey. Production of İnegöl meatballs started in the 1930s and quickly spread all over the country. The most important feature of Inegol meatballs is that no seasoning is used. Each meatball is between 12 and 15 grams and round, though some places make them flat as well. İnegöl meatballs consist of veal, lamb, salt, sodium-bicarbonate and onion mixture in specific proportions. Prepared meatballs are refrigerated for 2–3 hours, then they are ready to be cooked.

See also

 Akçaabat meatballs
 Islama köfte
 Ćevapi
 List of meatball dishes

References

External links
 Video

Kofta
Barbecue
Turkish cuisine